Nebulosa halesius is a moth of the family Notodontidae first described by Herbert Druce in 1885. It is found in Costa Rica.

The ground color of the forewings is reddish brown.

References

Moths described in 1885
Notodontidae